The Minister of Agriculture and Food is a councilor of state and chief of the Norway's Ministry of Agriculture and Food. The ministry is responsible for issues related to agriculture, forestry and food. Major subordinate agencies include the Norwegian Agriculture Authority, the Norwegian Food Safety Authority and Statskog. The position was created on 31 March 1900, along with the ministry, and Ole Anton Qvam was the inaugural officeholder. Fifty people from eight parties have held the office. During the German occupation of Norway from 1940 to 1945, the office was both held by a German puppet government and an elected government in London.

Until 2004 the position was known as the Minister of Agriculture. The longest-serving officeholder is Hans Ystgaard, who served for more than ten years under Prime Minister Johan Nygaardsvold, who himself holds the shortest tenure, of sixteen days. Gunhild Øyangen has served for more than nine years, and was also the first female to hold the position; while Gunnar Knudsen held it for more than eight, both in the course of two terms. Håkon Five has been appointed a record four times, serving for nearly five years. Jens Hundseid served in the office while being Prime Minister.

The current minister is Sandra Borch, who assumed the position in 2021.

Ministers
The following lists the minister, their party, date of assuming and leaving office, their tenure in years and days, and the cabinet they served in.

Parties

Ministers

References

Agriculture in Norway
 
Agriculture